is a Japanese football player for Zweigen Kanazawa.

Club statistics
Updated to 23 February 2018.

References

External links
shintaro shimada  on instagram 
Profile at Omiya Ardija

Profile at Roasso Kumamoto

1995 births
Living people
Association football people from Kumamoto Prefecture
Japanese footballers
J2 League players
J1 League players
Roasso Kumamoto players
Omiya Ardija players
Oita Trinita players
Zweigen Kanazawa players
Association football midfielders